SS Art Young was a Liberty ship built in the United States during World War II. She was named after Art Young, an American cartoonist and writer from Illinois. Young is best known for his socialist cartoons in the left-wing magazine The Masses.

Construction 
Art Young was laid down on 5 October 1944, under a Maritime Commission (MARCOM) contract, MC hull 2328, by J.A. Jones Construction, Panama City, Florida; sponsored by Mrs. J. Philo Caldwell, wife of the chief estimator at JAJCC, and launched on 13 November 1944.

History
She was allocated to A. L. Burbank & Company, Ltd, 22 November 1944. On 15 April 1948, she was placed in the National Defense Reserve Fleet, in Wilmington, North Carolina. On 10 May 1952, she was placed in the National Defense Reserve Fleet, in Beaumont, Texas.

She was sold for scrapping, 10 August 1971, to Luria Bros. and Co., Inc., for $43,300. She was withdrawn from the fleet, 30 November 1971.

References

Bibliography 

 
 
 
 

 

Liberty ships
Ships built in Panama City, Florida
1944 ships
Wilmington Reserve Fleet
Beaumont Reserve Fleet